N99 or rijksweg 99 is a freeway in the province of North Holland in the Netherlands.

Motorways in the Netherlands
Motorways in North Holland